Dawn Dawson is an American voice talent, sports broadcaster and former jetski racer. She is the first International Jet Sports Boating Association sanctioned female announcer for jetski racing.

Early life

Dawson was born in Dallas, Texas to Donald Dawson and Barbara Dawson. Dawson cites physics and music as some of her interests. She has a Bachelor of Science degree, majoring in Business Administration, from Sul Ross State University.

Career

Dawson started her career as a production manager at Pan Studios, where her professional mentor, Dale Nixon, introduced her to voice over work. She has lent her voice to multiple national ads, such as Spring Air Mattresses, Fruit Stripe gum and Mortgage Solutions Financial. Her voice over work spans over two decades and includes car dealer groups and other categories in Canada and around the US.

Reflections Advertising

Dawson started her own advertising agency in 1991 in Colorado Springs, Colorado. Her work has earned her an American Advertising Federation’s Silver Medal award for the Pikes Peak region, multiple Addy awards for creative and the Colorado Springs’ Gazette’s Best Of bronze medal award. Dawson’s agency work has also seen her receive the Colorado Springs Business Journal’s Top 40 Influential Women Award in 2000.

Jetski racing

Dawson first raced in 1992. She earned herself two world championship titles in Expert Women’s Ski class from the IJSBA in 1998 and 2000. Her racing career also saw her win multiple top ten positions in Novice Women’s Ski and Expert Ski. Dawson is also one of the first women to race in the IJSBA Expert Men’s Ski category on the IJSBA National tour, winning a bronze medal in 1998. 

Dawson, along with a team of jetski racing supporters in Florida, organized a premiere IJSBA sanctioned jetski racing event in 2018 called The Emerald Grand Prix at the Flora-Bama, in Pensacola, Florida.

Sports broadcasting

Dawson is as an announcer for various jetski racing competitions across the world. Shortly after winning her first world title, she took to announcing with the encouragement of long time announcing partner, Mike Young, in 1998. She has announced for the NZJSBA, AJSBA, JSRA, IJSBA, Pro Watercross, UIM-ABP’S Aquabike World Championship (powerboating), Blowsion, WCWA and CIWA. Her most recent international broadcasting credit is the 2018 Asian Games in Jakarta, where she commentated the jetski races at Ancol Beach.

References

Year of birth missing (living people)
Living people
Jet skiers
Sportspeople from Dallas
Women in advertising
American advertising executives